Cadavid is a surname meaning "house of David". Notable people with the surname include:

Andrés Cadavid (born 1985), Colombian footballer
Diego Cadavid (born 1978), Colombian actor and cinematographer
Esmeralda Arboleda Cadavid (1921–1997), Colombian politician
María Consolación García-Cortés Cadavid (born 1951), known as Chelo García-Cortés, Spanish journalist